{|

{{Infobox ship characteristics
|Hide header=
|Header caption=No.103 class
|Ship class=
|Ship type=
|Ship tonnage=
|Ship displacement=* standard
 trial
|Ship length=* overall
 waterline
|Ship beam= 
|Ship height=
|Ship draught= 
|Ship draft= 
|Ship propulsion=*1 × Kampon geared turbine
2 × Kampon water tube boilers
single shaft, 2,500 shp
|Ship power=
|Ship speed=
|Ship range=*Going:  at 
Returning:  at 
|Ship boats=
|Ship troops=
|Ship complement=100
|Ship capacity=*120 troops, 22 tons freight and
Example 1: 13 × Type 95 Ha-Go
Example 2: 9 × Type 97 Chi-Ha
Example 3: 7 × Type 2 Ka-Mi
Example 4: 5 × Type 3 Ka-Chi
Example 5: 220 tons freight
Example 6: approx. 280 troops
|Ship crew=
|Ship EW=
|Ship armament=*No.104, 20 August 19441 ×  L/40 AA gun
16 × Type 96 25 mm AA guns
4 × 13 mm AA guns
12 × depth charges
|Ship armour=
}}
|}T.140 or No. 140 was a 103-class landing ship tank of the Imperial Japanese Navy during the Second World War.

History
T.140 was laid down at the Sasebo Navy Yard on 26 July 1944, launched in August 1944, and completed in September 1944.

Reinforcement of Leyte
In January 1944, she was assigned to Convoy TA No. 9 which was tasked with the reinforcement of Leyte Island. The task force consisted of three transports (Mino Maru, Sorachi Maru, Tasmania Maru) carrying 4,000 troops of the 5th Infantry Regiment and two landing craft tank (T.140, T.159) carrying ten Type 2 Ke-To light tanks and 400 Special Naval Landing Force marines, escorted by Destroyer Division 30 (Yuzuki, Uzuki, Kiri) and Submarine Chaser Division 21 (CH-17, CH-37). On 9 December 1944, the task force left Manila for Ormoc Bay. On 11 December 1944, the convoy was attacked 30 miles off the coast of Leyte by 40 USMC F4U Corsair fighter-bombers of VMF-211, VMF-218, and VMF-313. The planes sank Tasmania Maru (1,192 dead) and Mino Maru (14 dead). Uzuki stayed behind to rescue survivors while Sorachi Maru, Ch-17, and Ch-37 were diverted to complete the landing at Palompon and T.140 and T.159, escorted by Yuzuki and Kiri, landed their troops and tanks as planned at Ormoc Bay. 8 of 10 tanks reached the shore but were quickly destroyed or captured on the beach by U.S. ground forces and the destroyer USS Coghlan. In the ensuing melee, both T. 159 and T.140 were heavily damaged. T.159 was deemed a total loss and abandoned while T.140 was able to limp away to safety. Sorachi Maru was able to safely disembark its troops at Palompon and then with CH-17 and Ch-37 as escorts, made it back to Manila on 3 December 1944. Uzuki was dispatched to join Kiri and Yuzuki with the damaged T.140 but was quickly spotted and torpedoed by the PT boats PT-490 and PT-492. While en route to Manila, Yūzuki was attacked and sunk by American aircraft. Kiri and T.140 made it to Manila on 3 December 1944.

Demise
T.140 was struck from the Navy List on 10 March 1945.

References

1944 ships
Ships built by Sasebo Naval Arsenal
Maritime incidents in January 1945
Ships sunk by US aircraft
Landing craft
Amphibious warfare vessels of Japan
World War II naval ships of Japan